Valence, or hedonic tone, is the affects' property specifying the intrinsic attractiveness/"good[ness]" (positive valence) or averseness/"bad[ness]" (negative valence) of an object, event, or situation. The term also categorises emotions.

History

The use of the term in psychology entered English with the translation from German ("Valenz") in 1935 of works of Kurt Lewin. The original German word suggests "binding," and is commonly used in a grammatical context to describe the ability of one word to semantically and syntactically link another, especially the ability of a verb to require a number of additional terms (e.g. subject and object) to form a complete sentence. 

The term chemical valence has been used in physics and chemistry to describe the mechanism by which atoms bind to one another since the nineteenth century.

Phenomenology
Valence is an inferred criterion from instinctively generated emotions; it is the property specifying whether feelings/affects are positive, negative or neutral. The existence of at least temporarily unspecified valence is an issue for psychological researchers who reject the existence of neutral emotions (e.g. surprise, sublimation). However, other psychological researchers assume that neutral emotions exist.

Measurement
Valence could be assigned a number and treated as if it were measured, but the validity of a measurement based on a subjective report is questionable. Measurement based on observations of facial expressions, using the Facial Action Coding System and microexpressions (see Paul Ekman) or muscle activity detected through facial electromyography, or on modern functional brain imaging may overcome this objection. The perceived emotional valence of a facial expression is represented in the right posterior superior temporal sulcus and medial prefrontal cortex.

Examples

"Negative" emotions like anger and fear have a negative valence. But positive emotions like joy have a positive valence. Positively valenced emotions are evoked by positively valenced events, objects, or situations. The term is also used to describe the hedonic tone of feelings, certain behaviors (for example, approach and avoidance), goal attainment or non-attainment, and conformity with or violation of norms. Ambivalence can be viewed as conflict between positive and negative valence-carriers.

Theorists taking a valence-based approach to study affect, judgment, and choice posit that emotions with the same valence (e.g., anger and fear or pride and surprise) produce a similar influence on judgments and choices. Suffering is negative valence and the opposite of this is pleasure or happiness.

See also
 Optimism bias
 Sentiment Analysis
 Vedanā

References

Emotions